Holly Miranda Smale (born 7 December 1981) is a British writer. She wrote the Geek Girl series. The first book in the series won the 2014 Waterstones Children's Book Prize and was shortlisted for the Roald Dahl Funny Prize 2013.  The final book, Forever Geek, was published by HarperCollins in March 2017.

Personal life

Holly Miranda Smale was born on 7 December 1981 in Hertfordshire, England. From an early age she loved reading and writing, and has stated that her childhood experiences of being bullied have influenced the subjects she chooses to write about. At the age of 15, Smale was recruited by a London modelling agency and became a fashion model. She modelled for two years but has stated in interviews that she did not enjoy it.

Smale studied at the University of Bristol, graduating with a Bachelor of Arts in English Literature and a Master of Arts in Shakespeare studies. She has held various jobs, including teaching English in Japan, and has travelled extensively.

Smale was diagnosed as being on the autistic spectrum at the age of 39 and subsequently with developmental coordination disorder. She has also mentioned having synesthesia, which in her case involves processing emotions as colours, dyscalculia, hyperlexia, coeliac disease and endometriosis. She identifies as a feminist.

Geek Girl series
Originally meant to be a trilogy, the Geek Girl series consists of six books. The humorous fiction follows the life of Harriet Manners, a nerdy 15-year-old girl who tries out modelling to "reinvent herself". Following her own diagnoses of autism and dyspraxia after the series concluded, Smale has retroactively described Harriet as having both conditions as well.

The first book in the series, Geek Girl, received favourable reviews and was the Number 1 debut teen fiction book of 2013 in the UK. It won the 2014 Waterstones' Children's Book Prize in the young adult category.  It also received the 2014 Leeds Book Award in the ages 11–14 category. and was shortlisted for the Roald Dahl Funny Prize 2013, the Queen of Teen award 2014 and the Branford Boase Award 2014.

2013 Geek Girl
2013 Model Misfit
2014 Picture Perfect
2015 All That Glitters
2016 Head Over Heels
2017 Forever Geek

For World Book Day (UK and Ireland) 2015, Smale also wrote an extra spin-off book titled Geek Drama set between Model Misfit and Picture Perfect. Also, a Christmas special not part of the main series titled All Wrapped Up was published in 2015, and a summer special titled Sunny Side Up was published in 2016.

The Valentines
In February 2019 Smale published Happy Girl Lucky, the first in a new series called The Valentines, about three sisters and a brother.

References

1981 births
British writers of young adult literature
English children's writers
Alumni of the University of Bristol
Living people
Place of birth missing (living people)
Women writers of young adult literature
People on the autism spectrum
People with autoimmune disease
English feminists